Quango Music Group is a record label founded in 1995 by Bruno Guez. Island Records distributes their releases.

Over the last decade, Quango has developed a tastemaker brand with a cult following. Quango's repertoire consists of artists and global-centric compilations totaling more than 50 releases, including, Kruder and Dorfmeister, Zero 7, Koop, Bliss, Cantoma, Bitter:Sweet, Gecko Turner, Talvin Singh, Bomb the Bass, and Alex Reece. With over 50 records released through Island Records and Palm Pictures, Quango has represented the emerging electronic sounds from around the world with a diverse roster of artists, and innovative concept compilations.

Background
The vision for Quango was created by Bruno Guez, the popular LA-based DJ, producer and tastemaker. Guez was joined by Jason Bentley (KCRW/KROQ-FM DJ) to create the Quango aesthetic via compilations and artist albums that are widely acknowledged as being ahead of their time. In all, 28 titles were released through Island Records featuring early tracks by the likes of Tricky, Sneaker Pimps and Basement Jaxx amongst many others. Releases included the first Kruder and Dorfmeister G-Stoned EP and Talvin Singh's Anokha. Compilations included Abstract Vibes, World Groove and the Journey Into Ambient Groove series.

During this time, Bruno also developed the programming and musical branding of Chris Blackwell's Island Outpost chain boutique hotels in Miami, the Bahamas, and Jamaica.

A decade later, Bruno continues to work closely with Chris Blackwell, executive producing Martina Topley-Bird's debut album as well as spearheading the musical direction of a new series of quintessential world music DVD projects for Blackwell's Palm World Voices label.

Quango represents and/or distributes Sunny Levine, Bitter:Sweet, Rosey, Slow Train Soul, Fat Freddy's Drop, Djosos Krost, Novalima, Kraak and Smaak, Gecko Turner, Cantoma, Bliss, Natalie Walker and Zero 7.

Revelator
Along with its experience from Quango, Bruno Guez has also created Revelator a SAAS platform to run every music business. Revelator  is deeply rooted in the music business and aims at bringing strong values such as transparency and more efficacy to the music industry. It is then providing precise right management tools for accounting and processes big data in a user friendly way to help labels and distributors to power their decision by relating them to tracks, artist, releases actual performances and revenue.

See also
 List of record labels

References

British record labels
Record labels established in 1995